The Lost Childhood is the title of several books.  It may refer to -

 The Lost Childhood and Other Essays, a collection by Graham Greene, published 1951
 The Lost Childhood (Nir book), by Yehuda Nir, published 2002